Naval Air Station Wildwood was a United States Navy airport located in Lower Township, Cape May County, New Jersey, United States, about  northwest of the central business district of Wildwood, a city in the same county. Former Hangar #1 now contains the Naval Air Station Wildwood Aviation Museum, whose collection focuses on World War II.

History
The airport started in 1941 as NAS Rio Grande, named for its location near Rio Grande, New Jersey. Due to confusion with Rio Grande, Texas, the name was changed to NAS Wildwood in 1943, in relation to Wildwood, New Jersey. Following the end of World War II, Naval Air Station Wildwood was deemed excess to U.S. Navy requirements.  It was subsequently deeded to the local government for transition to a civilian airport which is still in operation today as Cape May Airport.  The surviving portions of the historic airfield, including its runways and taxiways, were listed on the National Register of Historic Places in 2015.

Historic district

The Naval Air Station Wildwood Historic District is an  historic district encompassing the airfield, bounded by Forrestal and Monterre Roads, and the runways and taxiways to the north and east. The district includes two contributing buildings and one contributing structure. It was added for its significance in military history from 1942 to 1945.

See also
National Register of Historic Places listings in Cape May County, New Jersey

References

Lower Township, New Jersey
United States Naval Air Stations
Military installations closed in the 1940s
Airports in New Jersey
1941 establishments in New Jersey
1945 disestablishments in New Jersey
Military facilities on the National Register of Historic Places in New Jersey
National Register of Historic Places in Cape May County, New Jersey
Historic districts on the National Register of Historic Places in New Jersey
New Jersey Register of Historic Places
Closed installations of the United States Navy